Mantispa is the type genus of insects in the family Mantispidae and subfamily Mantispinae (order Neuroptera).  Species have a fairly worldwide distribution (but not Australia).

Description
The defining characteristic of Mantispa is the presence of dark, short, thick setae on the  mesothorax and occiput (rear head segment).

Species 
The Catalogue of Life lists:

 Mantispa adelungi Navás, 1912
 Mantispa agapeta (Navás, 1914)
 Mantispa alicante Banks, 1913
 Mantispa amabilis Gerstäcker, 1894
 Mantispa ambonensis Ohl, 2004
 Mantispa annulicornis Gerstäcker, 1894
 Mantispa aphavexelte U. Aspöck & H. Aspöck, 1994
 Mantispa ariasi Penny, 1983
 Mantispa axillaris Navás, 1908
 Mantispa azihuna (Stitz, 1913)
 Mantispa basalis (Navás, 1927)
 Mantispa basilei (Navás, 1930)
 Mantispa bella Kuwayama, 1925
 Mantispa bicolor (Stitz, 1913)
 Mantispa boliviana (Navás, 1927)
 Mantispa brevistigma C.-k. Yang, 1999
 Mantispa capeneri Handschin, 1959
 Mantispa castaneipennis Esben-Petersen, 1917
 Mantispa celebensis Enderlein, 1910
 Mantispa centenaria Esben-Petersen, 1917
 Mantispa chlorodes (Navás, 1914)
 Mantispa chlorotica (Navás, 1912)
 Mantispa chrysops Stitz, 1913
 Mantispa completa Banks, 1920
 Mantispa confluens Navás, 1914
 Mantispa coomani (Navás, 1930)
 Mantispa coorgensis Ohl, 2004
 Mantispa cora Newman, 1838
 Mantispa cordieri (Navás, 1933)
 Mantispa crenata Navás, 1914
 Mantispa decepta Banks, 1920
 Mantispa delicata (Navás, 1914)
 Mantispa deliciosa (Navás, 1927)
 Mantispa dispersa (Navás, 1914)
 Mantispa ellenbergeri (Navás, 1927)
 Mantispa elpidica (Navás, 1914)
 Mantispa enderleini Banks, 1914
 Mantispa fausta (Thunberg, 1784)
 Mantispa femoralis Navás, 1914
 Mantispa fenestralis Navás, 1914
 Mantispa finoti Navás, 1909
 Mantispa flavicauda (Navás, 1914)
 Mantispa flavinota Handschin, 1963
 Mantispa frontalis (Navás, 1914)
 Mantispa fuliginosa Loew in Hagen, 1859
 Mantispa fulvicornis Navás, 1929
 Mantispa fuscipennis Erichson, 1839
 Mantispa gillavryna (Navás, 1926)
 Mantispa gradata (Navás, 1926)
 Mantispa greeni Banks, 1913
 Mantispa gulosa Taylor, 1862
 Mantispa guttula Fairmaire in Thomson, 1858
 Mantispa haematina (Navás, 1914)
 Mantispa haugi Navás, 1909
 Mantispa indica Westwood, 1852
 Mantispa iridipennis Guérin-Méneville, 1844
 Mantispa japonica McLachlan, 1875
 Mantispa javanica Westwood, 1852
 Mantispa latifrons Enderlein, 1910
 Mantispa lineaticollis Enderlein, 1910
 Mantispa lineolata Westwood, 1852
 Mantispa lobata Navás, 1912
 Mantispa loveni (Navás, 1928)
 Mantispa luederwaldti Enderlein, 1910
 Mantispa lurida Walker, 1860
 Mantispa lutea (Stitz, 1913)
 Mantispa luzonensis Navás, 1909
 Mantispa maindroni Navás, 1909
 Mantispa mandarina Navás, 1914
 Mantispa marshalli (Navás, 1914)
 Mantispa meadewaldina (Navás, 1914)
 Mantispa melanocera (Navás, 1913)
 Mantispa militaris (Navás, 1914)
 Mantispa moluccensis Banks, 1913
 Mantispa moucheti (Navás, 1925)
 Mantispa moulti Navás, 1909
 Mantispa nana (Lichtenstein, 1802)
 Mantispa nanyukina (Navás, 1933)
 Mantispa navasi Handschin, 1960
 Mantispa negusa Navás, 1914
 Mantispa neotropica Navás, 1933
 Mantispa neptunica Navás, 1914
 Mantispa newmani Banks, 1920
 Mantispa nubila (Stitz, 1913)
 Mantispa obscurata (Navás, 1914)
 Mantispa pallescens Stitz, 1913
 Mantispa paraguayana Ohl, 2004
 Mantispa parvula Penny, 1983
 Mantispa pasteuri Navás, 1909
 Mantispa pehlkei Enderlein, 1910
 Mantispa perla (Pallas, 1772)
 Mantispa phaeonota Navás, 1933
 Mantispa plicicollis Handschin, 1935
 Mantispa punctata (Stitz, 1913)
 Mantispa pygmaea (Stitz, 1913)
 Mantispa radialis (Navás, 1929)
 Mantispa radiata (Navás, 1914)
 Mantispa rimata (Navás, 1929)
 Mantispa rufescens Latreille, 1807
 Mantispa salana (Navás, 1931)
 Mantispa scabricollis McLachlan in Fedchenko, 1875
 Mantispa schoutedeni (Navás, 1929)
 Mantispa scutellaris Westwood, 1852
 Mantispa similata (Navás, 1922)
 Mantispa simplex Stitz, 1913
 Mantispa stenoptera Gerstäcker, 1888
 Mantispa stigmata (Stitz, 1913)
 Mantispa strigipes Westwood, 1852
 Mantispa styriaca (Poda, 1761)
 Mantispa subcostalis Navás, 1929
 Mantispa taina (Alayo, 1968)
 Mantispa tenella Erichson, 1839
 Mantispa tenera (Navás, 1914)
 Mantispa tessmanni (Stitz, 1913)
 Mantispa thomensis Viette, 1958
 Mantispa tonkinensis Navás, 1930
 Mantispa transversa (Stitz, 1913)
 Mantispa umbripennis Walker, 1860
 Mantispa uniformis (Navás, 1927)
 Mantispa variolosa Navás, 1914
 Mantispa venulosa (Navás, 1914)
 Mantispa verruculata (Navás, 1914)
 Mantispa virescens Rambur, 1842
 Mantispa zayasi (Alayo, 1968)
 Mantispa zonaria Navás, 1925
 Mantispa zonata Navás, 1923

References

External links
 

Mantispoidea
Neuroptera genera